United Democratic Front may refer to:

United Democratic Front (Botswana)
United Democratic Front (Kerala), India
United Democratic Front (Mizoram), India
United Democratic Front (Malawi)
United Democratic Front (Namibia)
United Democratic Front (Pakistan)
United Democratic Front (South Africa)
United Democratic Front (South Sudan)

See also
 All India United Democratic Front
 Swaziland United Democratic Front
 Union of Democratic Forces (disambiguation)
 United Democratic Forces (disambiguation)
 United Front for Democratic Change (Chad)